Pang Xunqin (Chinese: 庞薰琹; June 20, 1906 – March 18, 1985) was a Chinese painter and teacher who, after studying in Paris, moved back to China and gave "traditional decoration art a modern context." Pang was also a co-founding member of the Storm Society, which aimed to bring a Parisian-style art world to China. He was greatly inspired by the French Art Nouveau movement.

Early life 
Pang was born in Jiangsu to a landlord family. Demonstrating an inclination towards color and design at a young age, he started learning about the traditional Chinese painting of flowers at eleven. He studied medicine in Shanghai from 1921 to 1924 after being told by a foreign priest that the Chinese could never become great artists. In September 1925, Pang moved to Paris to study oil painting at the Académie Julian at the age of 19, following fellow patriots such as Xu Beihong. At the time, Paris was at the epicenter of newfound artistic trends, from Cubism to Fauvism, and was flocked to by foreign artists.

Pang spent over a year at the Académie Julian learning technical skills through live sketching, and receiving critiques from teachers at the prestigious École Nationale des Beaux-Arts. Influenced heavily by fellow artist Chang Yu, Pang followed Chang's advice not to enter the École Nationale des Beaux-Arts after his time at the Académie Julian. He began using Chinese ink brushes to sketch after observing Chang using the same technique. This technique supported Pang's desire to meld European modernism with traditional Chinese sketch conceptualism, in spite of many of his contemporaries resurrecting the Chinese tradition as an alternative to modernism. Most of Pang's work at the time was portraiture, self or otherwise.

Return to China 
Pang returned to China in 1930 to a divided nation that valued European academic realism over modernism. He returned to his hometown to study book on Chinese art history and theory, finding it difficult to return to a country which he had spent the past five years in no contact with. Pang held numerous solo exhibitions and, with Chang Ta-chien, founded the Tai-mong Association and later the Storm Society.

Pang wedded female artist Qiu Ti in 1932. During wars in the 1930s to early 1940s, Pang was forced to move frequently, all the while teaching and painting. In 1936, after the disbandment of the Storm Society, he taught at the Beiping Art Academy. He founded the Central College of Arts and Crafts in 1953, China's first arts and crafts institute. However, as a result of the Cultural Revolution, Pang was banned from teaching during China's Anti-Rightist Campaign, being forced into retirement in 1972. He spent the next two decades painting brightly colored still lifes and writing Studies on Chinese Decorative Paintings of the Previous Dynasties, which would be published in 1982. Pang was reinstated as a teacher in 1979 and his later academic research focused on Chinese traditional crafts and decoration. He had been impressed deeply by women in the rural mountains' ability to create beautiful patterns and motifs from only their imaginations.

In 1984, he completed his memoir, which was published by San-Lian Press that year. He died in Beijing in 1985 from complications of gastric cancer. The Pang Xunqin Memorial Arts Museum was founded in 1991 in his hometown, where almost five hundred paintings are exhibited.

Storm Society 
In 1931, Pang co-founded the avant-garde  (Chinese: 決瀾社 Juelan She "a great wave") with Ni Yide; an artist, critic, and writer. Three other artists, including Lin Fengmian, joined the Post-Impressionistic and Expressionist group. Between 1931 and 1935 the Storm Society held four exhibitions. The Storm Society's Manifesto claimed they were suffering under the stationary ways of the old society and had to escape. In October 1932 they printed this Manifesto, imploring "Let us rise up! With our raging passion and iron intellect, we will create a world interwoven with color, line, and form!" Pang himself said in retrospect there were several reasons for the advent of the group, "firstly, the members were all discontented with reality... secondly, everyone wanted to create a new road in art, and no one had the strength to do this individually... and thirdly, none of these people wanted to be dependent on powerful people."

The Storm Society disbanded due to the war, when realistic propaganda art became the only acceptable media.

Philosophy 
Pang painted with a lyrical sensitivity. He believed in the freedom of an artist and the necessity of changing one's painting as one gained new experience and knowledge. He often quoted Picasso as his favorite artist because of his impulsivity in rejecting his own previous styles in favor of the search for new ways of expression. He valued technical skill, but acknowledged the decreased need for it as photographs became more popular. Above all, young Pang praised self-expression.

Later in life, facing wars, Pang would come to call his stress on individuality "superficial," remarking instead on the power of art against oppression.

References

External links 

 A Retrospective of Pang's Work
 Summary of artistic career at ArtDaily

1906 births
1985 deaths
Republic of China painters
Painters from Suzhou
Académie Julian alumni
Victims of the Cultural Revolution
Deaths from stomach cancer
20th-century Chinese painters
Victims of the Anti-Rightist Campaign
People from Changshu
Chinese expatriates in France